Extraterritorial abduction, also known as international abduction, is the practice of one country abducting someone from another country's territory outside the legal process of extradition. Extraordinary rendition is a form of extraterritorial abduction involving transfer to a third country. Extraterritorial abduction with the purpose of bringing the person to trial in the abducting country is contrary to international law.

By country

China 

China abducts its citizens from e.g. Hong Kong or Australia, within its program of repatriating more than 3,000 people "who had escaped overseas".

Czechoslovakia
During the first years of the Cold War until the 1960s, Czechoslovakia's secret service, the StB, abducted defectors overseas. One victim was the Social Democratic politician Bohumil Lausman, abducted from Austria in 1953 by Czechoslovak agents abusing diplomatic immunity.

Iran 
In October 2020, having lived in exile in Sweden for 14 years, Iranian-Swedish political activist Habib Chaab visited Turkey where he was abducted and smuggled to Iran. Turkish security sources say Iranian intelligence was behind Chaab's kidnapping.

Israel
Israel abducted nuclear whistleblower Mordechai Vanunu from Italy in 1986 and Nazi war criminal Adolf Eichmann from Argentina in 1960.

Saudi Arabia 

Prince Sultan bin Turki bin Abdulaziz, Jamal Ahmad Khashoggi, and many other critics of the Saudi authorities have been abducted and then murdered or rendered against their will to Saudi Arabia since 1979.

Turkey 

Kosovo, Gabon, Sudan, the Republic of Moldova, Azerbaijan, Ukraine, Malaysia, Switzerland and Mongolia: Turkish nationals connected with the opposition Gülen movement have been abducted and forcibly returned to Turkey without extradition proceedings.

In March 2018, six Turkish nationals from Kosovo had been captured by Turkish intelligence and brought to Turkey over alleged links to schools financed by the Gulen movement. Turkish President Recep Tayyip Erdoğan said in a speaking to supporters and party members in Istanbul: “Our National Intelligence Agency captured six of the highest ranking members (of Gulen’s network) in the Balkans in the operation it conducted in Kosovo,”

United States
The first well-known American rendition case involved the Achille Lauro hijackers in 1985. After they were given a plane and were en route in international air space, they were forced by United States Navy fighter planes to land at the Naval Air Station Sigonella, an Italian military base in Sicily used by the US Navy and NATO. The intent was to bring the hijackers within judicial reach of United States government representatives for transport to and trial in the United States.

In September 1987, during the Reagan administration, the United States executed a rendition, code-named "Goldenrod," in a joint FBI-CIA operation. Agents lured Fawaz Yunis, wanted for his role in the hijacking of a Jordanian airliner that had American citizens on board, onto a boat off the coast of Cyprus and taken to international waters, where he was arrested.

The Reagan administration did not undertake this kidnapping lightly. Then-FBI Director William H. Webster had opposed an earlier bid to snatch Yunis, arguing that the United States should not adopt the tactics of Israel, which had abducted Adolf Eichmann on a residential street in Buenos Aires, Argentina, in 1960 ... In 1984 and 1986, during a wave of terrorist attacks, Congress passed laws making air piracy and attacks on Americans abroad federal crimes. Ronald Reagan added teeth to these laws by signing a secret covert-action directive in 1986 that authorized the CIA to kidnap, anywhere abroad, foreigners wanted for terrorism. A new word entered the dictionary of U.S. foreign relations: rendition.

Vietnam 
In July 2017, the former Vietnamese politician and businessman Trịnh Xuân Thanh was secretly abducted and kidnapped in Berlin by a group of unnamed Vietnamese personnel believed to be Vietnamese agents in Germany. Germany expelled two Vietnamese diplomats in response.

References

Kidnapping